Tampico is a municipality located in the Mexican state of Tamaulipas. The largest city in it is Tampico, Tamaulipas.

External links
Gobierno Municipal de Tampico Official website

Municipalities of Tamaulipas